James Hume (1858 – 1 June 1909) was a Scottish-born New Zealand cricketer who played for Otago. He was born in Glasgow and died in Malaysia.

Hume made a single first-class appearance for the team, during the 1880–81 season, against Canterbury. He scored a single run in each innings in which he batted, as Otago lost the match by an innings margin.

See also
 List of Otago representative cricketers

External links
James Hume at Cricket Archive 

1858 births
1909 deaths
New Zealand cricketers
Otago cricketers